This is a list of diseases of Radermachera sinica (China doll).

Fungal diseases

References
Common Names of Diseases, The American Phytopathological Society

Radermachera sinica diseases